Robot Boy may refer to:

 Robotboy, a British-French animated show.
 ViR: The Robot Boy, an Indian animated show.
 "Robot Boy", a track on the Linkin Park album A Thousand Suns.
 Astro Boy.